Michael Wang may refer to:

Michael Wang (artist) (born 1981), American artist
Michael Wang (basketball) (born 2000), Chinese basketball player
Michael Wang (poker), American poker player
Michael Wang (scientist)

See also
Michael Wong (disambiguation)